Vladimir Viktorovich Uyba, born in 1958, is a Russian statesman, scientist, and doctor, who is the acting Head of the Komi Republic since April 2, 2020. Before being appointed to that position, he was deputy health minister and head of the Federal Biomedical Agency.

He is a doctor of medical sciences, a professor, and acting State Advisor to the Russian Federation, Grade 1 (2012). He was made an Honored Doctor of the Russian Federation (1998), Honored Scientist of the Russian Federation, Honored Doctor of the Chechen Republic, Honored Doctor of the Republic of Ingushetia, and Honored Doctor of the Republic of South Ossetia. He is of Estonian descent through his father.

Uyba is under personal sanctions introduced by the United Kingdom, Canada and Ukraine as he supported Russian invasion of Ukraine.

Biography 
Uyba was born on October 4, 1958 (at birth he was named Valentin, but he changed his name to Vladimir between 2010 and 2019). He was born in Omsk, in a family of engineers. In an interview, Uiba said that his father had Estonian roots, hence his surname has only one declention and should be pronounced as "Uibo".

Education 
In 2000, he graduated from the Russian Presidential Academy of National Economy and Public Administration with a degree in Economics and Enterprise Management. He is a Doctor of Medicine and University Professor.

Head of the Komi Republic 
On April 2, 2020, President Vladimir Putin appointed Vladimir Uyba as acting Head of the Komi Republic. He replaced Sergey Gaplikov, who resigned because of the grave situation in the region caused by the COVID-19 pandemic.

Upon his appointment, Uyba brought several colleagues from the Federal medical-biological Agency (FMBA), where he had previously worked. He appointed Sergei Mamonov as the acting deputy head of the republican administration; and Dmitry Samovarov as the head of the regional administration. Viktoria Filina headed of the regional Ministry of Health. Moreover, in April of the same year, Uyba protested against the construction of the Shiyes landfill.

On April 17, 2020, Vladimir Uyba announced that he would run for the Head of the Komi Republic office in the elections scheduled for September of the same year. On June 24, he officially nominated his candidacy. On August 6, he was registered by the republican election commission as a candidate of the United Russia Party.

His inauguration took place on September 23, 2020. Later, the Russian Communist Party refused to recognize him as the legitimately electedcandidate and called him an "impostor".

Since January 29, 2022, he serves as Secretary of the regional branch of the United Russia Party (previously, he was the Acting Secretary from December 3, 2021 to January 29, 2022).

References

External links 

Living people
1958 births
1st class Active State Councillors of the Russian Federation
Heads of the Komi Republic
Russian people of Estonian descent
Politicians from Omsk
Recipients of the Order "For Merit to the Fatherland", 3rd class
Russian Presidential Academy of National Economy and Public Administration alumni
Russian physicians